In mathematics, positive semidefinite may refer to:
 Positive semidefinite function
 Positive semidefinite matrix
 Positive semidefinite quadratic form
 Positive semidefinite bilinear form